Harald Klose (born 12 March 1945) is a German former footballer who played as a forward.

References

External links
 
 

1945 births
Living people
German footballers
Association football forwards
Bundesliga players
Ligue 1 players
Ligue 2 players
FC Schalke 04 players
Bayer 04 Leverkusen players
K. Berchem Sport players
Valenciennes FC players
German expatriate footballers
German expatriate sportspeople in France
Expatriate footballers in France